Lamong is an unincorporated community in Washington Township, Hamilton County, Indiana.

History
A post office was established at Lamong in 1874, and remained in operation until it was discontinued in 1902.

Geography

References

Unincorporated communities in Hamilton County, Indiana
Unincorporated communities in Indiana
Indianapolis metropolitan area